The 25th General Assembly of Nova Scotia represented Nova Scotia between 1871 and 1874.

Jared C. Troop was chosen as speaker for the house.

The assembly was dissolved on November 23, 1874.

List of Members 

Notes:

References 
 

Terms of the General Assembly of Nova Scotia
1871 establishments in Nova Scotia
1874 disestablishments in Nova Scotia
19th century in Nova Scotia